Edward F. Sorin is an outdoor sculpture by Italian sculptor Ernesto Biondi (January 30, 1855 – 1917). It is located on the campus of the University of Notre Dame near South Bend, Indiana. The eight foot tall statue depicting the founder of Notre Dame is placed on the main quadrangle of the University near the Main Building. The statue, made of bronze, was unveiled on its campus on May 3, 1906.

Description
“Edward F. Sorin” is a life-sized statue composed of bronze, a favorite material of artist Ernesto Biondi. It measures 8 ft. x 2 ft. 6 in. x 2 ft. 6 in. and is mounted on top of a pedestal made of Vermont granite that reads “SORIN.” The statue depicts Sorin with a long beard wearing his priestly vestments. His arms are folded, and his right hand is grasping his left wrist. In his left hand he holds a partially open book.

The front of the stone base that the statue sits on reads:

Historical information

Sorin’s Role in Founding Notre Dame
Sorin was born in February 1814 near Laval, Mayenne. Following his ordination as a priest in the Congregation of Holy Cross, he traveled as a missionary to the United States where he worked in Indiana, what was then considered a very remote area of the nation. Accompanied by six brothers, he landed in New York and proceeded to Indiana where he acquired possession of 524 snow-covered acres of land from the Bishop of  Vincennes, Indiana. On November 26, 1842, Sorin began the foundation of the University of Notre Dame on this land.

Acquisition
The University of Notre Dame commissioned artist Ernesto Biondi to create the statue in memory of Sorin. The price of the commission was not disclosed.

Unveiling Ceremony
Before the time of the unveiling of the monument, a Mass was celebrated on the campus of the University of Notre Dame in the Basilica of the Sacred Heart, Notre Dame. The sermon was preached by Rev. John J. Keane, D.D., Archbishop of Dubuque, and the Mass was celebrated by Rev. Bishop Alerding of Fort Wayne. Scores of visiting clergy attended including Rev. Monsignor Oechtering. More than 100 ministers wore red and purple, and about 50 male singers were present. A quartette of seminarians sang at the offertory, and the church was filled with candles and incense. With attendees from the student body and friends of the university, the church was filled to capacity. 
					
After Mass a procession from the Basilica to the grounds where the statue was to be unveiled occurred. The students marched according to their respective halls. They were followed by the dignified array of graduates and faculty in cap and gown, then the acolytes and ministers, and lastly the members of the community and the visitors. A platform was erected beside the monument, and around this stood the audience of about 3,000. The University Band provided music appropriate for the occasion.

Before the statue was revealed, it was shrouded in the American flag and the papal ensign. Then-president of Notre Dame Father John J. Cavanaugh offered a reflection, and then a cord was pulled to reveal the statue. The crowd reacted to the statue by calling it “perfect” and “matchless.” The student body erupted in a cheer of “U.N.D.”

Artist

Condition
After being surveyed in May 1993, the Indiana survey Save Outdoor Sculpture filed Edward F. Sorin as “Treatment Urgent.”

See also
 List of public art in St. Joseph County, Indiana
 Edward Sorin

References

External links
  Romancing the Golden Dome
 The Notre Dame Scholastic
 Flickr Image

1906 sculptures
Bronze sculptures in Indiana
Outdoor sculptures in Notre Dame
University of Notre Dame Public Art Collection